| tries = {{#expr:
 + 6 + 7 + 1 + 5 + 2 + 2 + 1 + 1
 + 6 + 6 + 1 + 1 + 5 + 5 + 8 + 5
 + 5 + 3 + 3 + 2 + 3 + 4 + 1 + 3
 + 4 + 3 + 5 + 3 + 4 + 8 + 3 + 7
 + 1 + 0 + 4 + 5 + 3 + 5 + 5 + 7
 + 1 + 5 + 6 + 1 + 6 + 2 + 1 + 3
}}
| top point scorer = Gilles Bosch (Carcassonne)180 points
| top try scorer   = Taleta Tupuloa (Montauban) & Rodney Davies (Biarritz)6 tries
| website          = www.lnr.fr
| prevseason       = 2013–14
| nextseason       = 2015–16
}}
The 2014–15 Rugby Pro D2 was the second-level French rugby union club competition, behind the Top 14, for the 2014–15 season. It ran alongside the 2014–15 Top 14 competition; both competitions are operated by the Ligue Nationale de Rugby (LNR). The average team salaries at the outset of the 2014–15 season were €5.97m; Biarritz and Perpignan had the highest team salaries with €11.07m.

Teams

Changes in the lineup from 2013–14 were:
 Lyon won the 2013–14 Pro D2 title and were thereby automatically promoted to the Top 14. La Rochelle won the promotion playoffs to secure the second promotion place.
 The bottom two finishers in 2013–14, Bourg-en-Bresse and Auch, were relegated from Pro D2 to Fédérale 1. 
 The two bottom finishers in the 2013–14 Top 14 season, Perpignan and Biarritz Olympique, were relegated to Pro D2.
 The two finalists in Fédérale 1, champion Montauban and runner-up Massy, earned promotion.

Competition format
The top team at the end of the regular season (after all the teams played one another twice, once at home, once away), is declared champion and earns a spot in the next Top 14 season. Teams ranked second to fifth compete in promotion playoffs, with the semifinals being played at the home ground of the higher-ranked team. The final is then played on neutral ground, and the winner earns the second ticket to the next Top 14.

The LNR uses a slightly different bonus points system from that used in most other rugby competitions. It trialled a new system in 2007–08 explicitly designed to prevent a losing team from earning more than one bonus point in a match, a system that also made it impossible for either team to earn a bonus point in a drawn match. LNR chose to continue with this system for subsequent seasons.

France's bonus point system operates as follows:

 4 points for a win.
 2 points for a draw.
 1 bonus point for winning while scoring at least 3 more tries than the opponent. This replaces the standard bonus point for scoring 4 tries regardless of the match result.
 1 bonus point for losing by 5 points (or less). This is a change from previous seasons, in which the margin was 7 points or less.

Table

Relegation
Previously, the teams that finish in 15th and 16th places in the table are relegated to Fédérale 1 at the end of the season.  In certain circumstances, "financial reasons" may cause a higher-placed team to be demoted instead, or prevent one of the two finalists in Fédérale 1 from promotion.

This season saw an example of the latter situation. Following the 2014–15 season, 15th-place Dax was spared relegation after Fédérale 1 runner-up Lille was denied promotion due to excessive debt and failed in an appeal of the decision.

The last instance of a team outside the bottom two places being relegated was at the end of the 2011–12 season, when 9th-place Bourgoin were relegated, thereby reprieving 15th-place Béziers.

Fixtures
The outline fixtures schedule was announced on 16 May 2014.

Round 1

Round 2

Round 3

Round 4

Round 5

Round 6

Round 7

Round 8

Round 9

Round 10

Round 11

Round 12

Round 13

Round 14
Weekend of 13 December 2014

Round 15
Weekend of 20 December 2014

Round 16
Weekend of 10 January 2015

Round 17
Weekend of 17 January 2015

Round 18
Weekend of 24 January 2015

Round 19
Weekend of 31 January 2015

Round 20
Weekend of 7 February 2015

Round 21
Weekend of 21 February 2015

Round 22
Weekend of 28 February 2015

Round 23
Weekend of 7 March 2015

Round 24
Weekend of 14 March 2015

Round 25
Weekend of 28 March 2015

Round 26
Weekend of 4 April 2015

Round 27
Weekend of 11 April 2015

Round 28
Weekend of 25 April 2015

Round 29
Weekend of 2 May 2015

Round 30
Weekend of 9 May 2015

Play–offs
The highest ranked team at the end of the regular season, Pau, earned automatic promotion to the Top 14 as champion de France de PRO D2 2015.

Semi–finals
The semi–finals followed a 2 v 5, 3 v 4 system, with the higher ranked team playing at home.

 Under LNR rules, if a playoff match ends level after full-time, the first tiebreaker is try count. Agen advanced with 4 tries to Perpignan's 2.

Final
The winners of the semi–finals played off for the second promotion spot to the Top 14.

See also
2014–15 Top 14 season

References

External links
  Ligue Nationale de Rugby – Official website
  Midi Olympique

2014-15
2014–15 in French rugby union leagues